St. George's Sports Club is a football team founded in 1962 in Buff Bay, Portland Jamaica, founded in 1962 in the top-flight Jamaica National Premier League. The home ground of the club is Lynch Park which is situated by the shoreline of the north coast in the city of  Buff Bay, Portland.

St George's clinched promotion to the top level in June 2007 and are the first team from Portland to grace the Premier League since Taurus in the early 1990s. They returned to the NPL after more than 19 years. After relegation in the 2012 season, the club has gone throw several processes of rebuilding to attain a position in the Premier League.

At the start of the 2018–2019 season, a new management structure was established.

Club executives
President : Kingsley Chin
Director of Business : Fabio Pencle
Operations Manager : Oraine Selvin
Administrative Officer : Cadine Brown
Field & Administrative Support : Colin Leigh
Player Liaison Officer : Nicole Thomas
Player Liaison Assistant : Santana Wyndham
Equipment Support : Colin Leigh
Players Representative : 
Honorary Executive President : Everton King
Coaches
Brenton Lopez

Achievements
Major League Champions (PFA)2018–2019
Promoted to Premier League 2007
Many time Portland division 1 champion,
KO champion and Eastern Confed Super League Champion
Has represented Eastern Jamaica in the National premier league in 1988–89 and in 1989–90
Represented Eastern Confed. in the 2000 National A’ League

Managerial history
  Brenton Lopez (2018–present)
  Karl Wilson (2019–present)
  Geoffrey Maxwell (2010–2012)

References

External links
  Team profile at Golocaljamaica
  Team website

Football clubs in Jamaica
1962 establishments in Jamaica